Atletski Klub Mladost Užice (Serbian Cyrillic: Атлетски Клуб Младост Ужице) is an athletics club based in Užice. It is one of the most successful athletics clubs in Serbia, and is particularly known for producing long-distance runners.

History
In the club's recent history, the role of coach has been occupied by both Kuzmanović brothers Dragiša and Slavoljub, as well as Dragovan Ilić. Although the club trains on the rubber track at Užice City Stadium, the club has suffered from an almost nonexistent budget and has rarely afforded equipment necessary for some of its athletes. The lack of money in the club is such that its javelin throwers get javelins loaned to them, and long-distance runners are sent to Zlatibor where there is more open space to run than in Užice. In spite of financial hardship, the club has frequently produced great athletes, many of which have represented Serbia in international competition.

Notable athletes
Olivera Jevtić, Olympian marathoner
Mirko Petrović
Sreten Ninković
Predrag Ranđelović
Nemanja Cerovac
Kristijan Stošić
Stenlay Kipruto
Danijel Vukajlović
Željko Čeliković
Nikola Stamenić
Bogdan Pantić
Snežana Kostić
Jovana Ajdanić

References

Athletics clubs in Serbia